Luís Carlos Ramos Martins  (born 10 June 1992) is a Portuguese professional footballer who plays as a left-back for Major League Soccer club Vancouver Whitecaps FC.

Club career

Benfica and Gil
Born in Lamego, Viseu District, Martins was promoted to S.L. Benfica's first team for the 2011–12 season. He made his official debut for the club on 2 November 2011, starting in a UEFA Champions League group stage game against FC Basel and being replaced at the hour-mark of the 1–1 home draw by Miguel Vítor.

Martins started the 2012–13 campaign with Benfica's reserves, in the second division. On 9 January 2013, however, he signed a three-and-a-half-year contract with Gil Vicente F.C. in the Primeira Liga. He scored his first goal for the latter on 18 August of that year, closing a 2–0 home win over Académica de Coimbra.

Spain
On 1 September 2014, Martins agreed to a four-year deal with Granada CF from Spain, for an undisclosed fee. He played his first match in La Liga on the 27th, coming on as a second-half substitute in a 6–0 away loss to FC Barcelona.

On 24 August 2015, Martins was loaned to Segunda División side CA Osasuna for one year. Late into the 2017 January transfer window, after only 73 minutes of action upon his return to the Estadio Nuevo Los Cármenes, he joined C.S. Marítimo on a two-year loan.

Chaves
Martins signed a two-year contract with G.D. Chaves in June 2018. He scored his only goal for them on 10 February 2019, in a 2–1 league defeat at S.C. Braga.

Sporting KC
On 1 August 2019, Martins joined Sporting Kansas City until the end of the 2021 season with an option through to 2022. He scored his only goal for the club on 4 August 2021, the second in the 4–1 away win over Los Angeles FC.

Martins was released in November 2021.

Vancouver Whitecaps
On 4 May 2022, Martins signed with Vancouver Whitecaps FC also of the Major League Soccer for the remainder of the campaign.

International career
Martins was picked by Portugal under-20 coach Ilídio Vale for the 2011 FIFA World Cup in Colombia, helping the national team finish second to Brazil.

Honours
Portugal U20
FIFA U-20 World Cup runner-up: 2011

Orders
 Knight of the Order of Prince Henry

References

External links
 
 
 National team data 
 
 

1992 births
Living people
People from Lamego
Sportspeople from Viseu District
Portuguese footballers
Association football defenders
Primeira Liga players
Liga Portugal 2 players
S.L. Benfica footballers
S.L. Benfica B players
Gil Vicente F.C. players
C.S. Marítimo players
G.D. Chaves players
La Liga players
Segunda División players
Granada CF footballers
CA Osasuna players
Major League Soccer players
MLS Next Pro players
Sporting Kansas City players
Vancouver Whitecaps FC players
Whitecaps FC 2 players
Portugal youth international footballers
Portugal under-21 international footballers
Portuguese expatriate footballers
Expatriate footballers in Spain
Expatriate soccer players in the United States
Expatriate soccer players in Canada
Portuguese expatriate sportspeople in Spain
Portuguese expatriate sportspeople in the United States
Portuguese expatriate sportspeople in Canada